Choreutis is a moth genus. It belongs to the metalmark moths (family Choreutidae), and therein to subfamily Choreutinae. Of these, it is the type genus. The genus was described by Jacob Hübner in 1825.

Species

Choreutis achyrodes (Meyrick, 1912)
Choreutis aegyptiaca (Zeller, 1867)
Choreutis agelasta Bradley, 1965
Choreutis amethystodes (Meyrick, 1914)
Choreutis angulosa [Diakonoff], 1968
Choreutis anthorma (Meyrick, 1912)
Choreutis antichlora (Meyrick, 1912)
Choreutis antiptila Meyrick, 1912
Choreutis argoxantha (Meyrick, 1934)
Choreutis argyrota Meyrick 1912
Choreutis argyrastra Meyrick, 1932
Choreutis atrosignata (Christoph, 1888)
Choreutis basalis (R. Felder & Rogenhofer, 1875)
Choreutis bathysema (Diakonoff, 1978)
Choreutis betuliperda (Dyar, 1902)
Choreutis caradjai Diakonoff, 1984
Choreutis chalcotoxa (Meyrick, 1886)
Choreutis chelaspis (Meyrick, 1928)
Choreutis chi (Durrant, 1915)
Choreutis collapsa (Meyrick, 1934)
Choreutis cothurnata (Meyrick, 1912)
Choreutis cunuligera Diakonoff, 1978
Choreutis cyanogramma (Diakonoff & Arita, 1979)
Choreutis cyanotoxa (Meyrick, 1907)
Choreutis diana – Diana's choreutis moth
Choreutis dichlora (Meyrick, 1912)
Choreutis diplogramma (Meyrick, 1921)
Choreutis dryodora (Meyrick, 1921)
Choreutis emplecta 
Choreutis entechna (Meyrick, 1920)
Choreutis equatoris 
Choreutis euclista (Meyrick, 1918)
Choreutis eumetra (Meyrick, 1912)
Choreutis falsifica (Meyrick, 1927)
Choreutis flavimaculata 
Choreutis gratiosa (Meyrick, 1911)
Choreutis holachyrma (Meyrick, 1912)
Choreutis hyligenes (Butler, 1879)
Choreutis ialeura (Meyrick, 1912)
Choreutis inscriptana (Snellen, 1875)
Choreutis inspirata Meyrick, 1916
Choreutis irimochla (Meyrick, 1921)
Choreutis irridens (Meyrick, 1921)
Choreutis itriodes (Meyrick, 1912)
Choreutis japonica (Zeller, 1877)
Choreutis lethaea (Meyrick, 1912)
Choreutis limonias  
Choreutis ludifica (Meyrick, 1914)
Choreutis lutescens (C. Felder, R. Felder & Rogenhofer, 1875)
Choreutis marzoccai Pastrana, 1991
Choreutis melanopepla 
Choreutis melophaga (Meyrick, 1931)
Choreutis mesolyma (Diakonoff, 1978)
Choreutis metallica 
Choreutis minuta (Diakonoff & Arita, 1979)
Choreutis montana 
Choreutis nemorana – fig-tree skeletonizer, fig leaf roller
Choreutis niphocrypta (Meyrick, 1930)
Choreutis novarae C. Felder, R. Felder & Rogenhofer, 1875
Choreutis obarata (Meyrick, 1921)
Choreutis ophiosema (Lower, 1896)
Choreutis optica (Meyrick, 1921)
Choreutis ornaticornis (Walsingham, 1900)
Choreutis orthogona (Meyrick, 1886)
Choreutis pariana – apple-and-thorn skeletonizer, apple leaf skeletonizer
Choreutis parva (Pagenstecher, 1884)
Choreutis pelargodes (Meyrick, 1921)
Choreutis pentacyba Meyrick, 1926
Choreutis periploca 
Choreutis piepersiana (Snellen, 1885)
Choreutis plectodes (Meyrick, 1921)
Choreutis plumbealis (Pagenstecher, 1884)
Choreutis porphyratma (Meyrick, 1930)
Choreutis psilachyra (Meyrick, 1912)
Choreutis pychnomochla Bradley, 1965
Choreutis quincyella (Legrand, 1965)
Choreutis sandaracina (Meyrick, 1907)
Choreutis semicincta (Meyrick, 1921)
Choreutis sexfasciella (Sauber, 1902)
Choreutis simplex Diakonoff, 1955
Choreutis stereocrossa (Meyrick, 1921)
Choreutis strepsidesma (Meyrick, 1912)
Choreutis streptatma Meyrick, 1938
Choreutis submarginalis (Walker)
Choreutis sycopola 
Choreutis taprobanes (Zeller, 1877)
Choreutis tigroides (Meyrick, 1921)
Choreutis tomicodes (Meyrick, 1930)
Choreutis topitis (Durrant, 1915)
Choreutis torridula (Meyrick, 1926)
Choreutis tricyanitis (Meyrick, 1925)
Choreutis trogalia (Meyrick, 1912)
Choreutis turilega 
Choreutis vinosa (Diakonoff, 1978)
Choreutis xanthogramma (Meyrick, 1912)
Choreutis yakushimensis (Marumo, 1923)

External links
choreutidae.lifedesks.org

 
Choreutidae
Taxa named by Carl Alexander Clerck